William McMurray was a Canadian Anglican archdeacon in the second half of the 19th century.

McMurray was born in Portadown on 19 September 1810 but emigrated to York, Ontario as a child. He was  ordained in 1833 and served at Sault Ste. Marie, Ontario, Ancaster, Dundas and Niagara-on-the-Lake. He was Archdeacon of Diocese of Niagara from 1875 to until his death on 19 May 1894.

References

People from Portadown
Archdeacons of Niagara
19th-century Canadian Anglican priests
1810 births
1894 deaths
Irish emigrants to Canada (before 1923)